Charlotte County (2016 population 25,428) is the southwest-most county of New Brunswick, Canada.

It was formed in 1784 when New Brunswick was partitioned from Nova Scotia. Once a layer of local government, the county seat was abolished with the New Brunswick Equal Opportunity program in 1966. Counties continue to be used as census sundivisions by Statistics Canada.

Located in the southwestern corner of the province, bordering the US state of Maine, Charlotte County is at the northern end of the Appalachian Mountains, which gives it a rugged terrain that includes Mount Pleasant. The St. Croix, Magaguadavic, and Digdegaush rivers drain into the Bay of Fundy. The county includes the large, populated islands of Grand Manan, White Head, Deer Island, and Campobello.

Eighteen per cent of the workforce is employed in aquaculture. Connors Bros., the largest sardine canning facility in North America, is located in Blacks Harbour. Cooke Aquaculture is an Atlantic salmon farming company, founded and headquartered in St. George. A paper mill, operated by JD Irving, is in Utopia, and Flakeboard Co. Ltd. operates outside of St. Stephen. Ganong Bros., Canada's oldest chocolate company, maintains its factory in St. Stephen.

Governance is in the form of New Brunswick municipalities in the case of the towns of St. Andrews, St. George, and St. Stephen, the villages of Grand Manan and Blacks Harbour, and the rural community of Campobello Island. The remaining parts of the county are administered as local service districts of the Southwest New Brunswick Regional Service Commission, except Clarendon, which is part of RSC 11 in neighbouring Sunbury County.

Demographics 

Population by census subdivision

Language

Infrastructure

Power generation
Hydroelectric dams operate in St. George and St. Stephen at Milltown, though the latter is currently being decommissioned.

Major highways

See also
List of communities in New Brunswick
List of historic places in Charlotte County, New Brunswick
List of people from Charlotte County, New Brunswick
Disputed areas with the United States: Machias Seal Island, North Rock
List of parishes in New Brunswick

References

 
Counties of New Brunswick
1785 establishments in New Brunswick
Populated places established in 1785